Pearl Casias is a member of the Southern Ute Indian Tribal Council and former Tribal Judge. In 2011, she was elected to be the first female Chairperson of the Southern Ute Tribal Council.

Career
In 2011 Casias was elected as the first chairwoman in the history of the Southern Ute Tribal council;  a symbol of the traditional egalitarian ways the Utes experienced prior to colonization. The special election was held after former Chairman Matthew Box resigned. Clement J. Frost has preceded her as chairperson.

During her term, the Southern Ute Indian Tribe became a major producer of natural gas and received a "AAA" credit rating from national credit rating agencies, the first American Indian Nation to receive the rating.

After her retirement from the Tribal Council, Casias did consulting work for other Native American tribes. In 2018, she exited political retirement to serve an additional term as a member of the Southern Ute Tribal Council.

References

Living people
21st-century Native Americans
Chairmen of the Southern Ute Indian Tribe
Native American women in politics
Year of birth missing (living people)
21st-century Native American women